Chang Kwong Yin (born 24 February 2002) is a Hong Kong professional footballer who currently plays as a right winger for Hong Kong Premier League club Kitchee.

Career statistics

Club

Notes

References

Living people
2002 births
Hong Kong footballers
Hong Kong youth international footballers
Association football forwards
Hong Kong Premier League players
Kitchee SC players